The Fort Madison–Keokuk, IA-IL-MO Micropolitan Statistical Area, as defined by the United States Census Bureau, locally known as the "Tri-State" area, is an area consisting of three counties – one in southeast Iowa, one in northeast Missouri, and one in west central Illinois, anchored by the cities of Fort Madison, Iowa and Keokuk, Iowa. As of the 2010 census, the μSA had a population of 62,105. An estimate by the Census Bureau, as of July 1, 2012, placed the population at 61,477, a decrease of 1.01%.

Counties
Clark County, Missouri
Hancock County, Illinois
Lee County, Iowa (Central county)

Communities
  
Places with more than 10,000 inhabitants
Fort Madison, Iowa (Principal city)
Keokuk, Iowa (Principal city)
Places with 1,000 to 5,000 inhabitants
Carthage, Illinois
Dallas City, Illinois
Hamilton, Illinois
La Harpe, Illinois
Kahoka, Missouri
Nauvoo, Illinois
Warsaw, Illinois
Places with 500 to 1,000 inhabitants
Augusta, Illinois
Bowen, Illinois
Donnellson, Iowa
Montrose, Iowa
Plymouth, Illinois
West Point, Iowa
Places with less than 500 inhabitants
Alexandria, Missouri
Basco, Illinois
Bentley, Illinois
Elvaston, Illinois
Ferris, Illinois
Franklin, Iowa
Houghton, Iowa
Luray, Missouri
Pontoosuc, Illinois
Revere, Missouri
St. Paul, Iowa
Wayland, Missouri
West Point, Illinois
Wyaconda, Missouri
Unincorporated places
Adrian, Illinois
Argyle, Iowa
Breckenridge, Hancock County, Illinois
Burnside, Illinois
Chili, Illinois
Colusa, Illinois
Denmark, Iowa
Denver, Illinois
Disco, Illinois
Durham, Illinois
Fountain Green, Illinois
La Crosse, Illinois
Niota, Illinois
Pilot Grove, Iowa
St. Patrick, Missouri
Stillwell, Illinois
Sutter, Hancock County, Illinois
Tioga, Illinois
Webster, Illinois
Wever, Iowa

Townships

Clark County, Missouri

 Clay
 Des Moines
 Folker
 Grant
 Jackson
 Jefferson
 Lincoln
 Madison
 Sweet Home
 Union
 Vernon
 Washington
 Wyaconda

Hancock County, Illinois

 Appanoose
 Augusta
 Bear Creek
 Carthage
 Chili
 Dallas City
 Durham
 Fountain Green
 Hancock
 Harmony
 La Harpe
 Montebello
 Nauvoo
 Pilot Grove
 Pontoosuc
 Prairie
 Rock Creek
 Rocky Run
 Sonora
 St. Albans
 St. Mary's
 Walker
 Warsaw
 Wilcox
 Wythe

Lee County, Iowa

 Cedar
 Charleston
 Denmark
 Des Moines
 Franklin
 Green Bay
 Harrison
 Jackson
 Jefferson
 Madison
 Marion
 Montrose
 Pleasant Ridge
 Van Buren
 Washington
 West Point

Demographics

As of the census of 2000, there were 45,468 people, 18,127 households, and 12,327 families residing within the μSA. The racial makeup of the μSA was 94.99% White, 2.36% African American, 0.25% Native American, 0.34% Asian, 0.05% Pacific Islander, 0.90% from other races, and 1.11% from two or more races. Hispanic or Latino of any race were 2.10% of the population.

The median income for a household in the μSA was $32,825, and the median income for a family was $39,464. Males had a median income of $29,783 versus $20,869 for females. The per capita income for the μSA was $17,209.

See also
Illinois statistical areas
Iowa census statistical areas
List of metropolitan areas of the United States
Missouri census statistical areas

References

 
Clark County, Missouri
Geography of Lee County, Iowa
Hancock County, Illinois
Micropolitan areas of Illinois
Micropolitan areas of Iowa
Micropolitan areas of Missouri